Bigg Boss 4 is the fourth season of Indian reality TV show Bigg Boss, which aired on Colors TV from 3 October 2010. This season was longer than its predecessor, Bigg Boss 3 and lasted for 14 weeks (97 days) ending on 8 January 2011. Salman Khan joined the show for the first time as host and has subsequently hosted all the following season. This season became the highest rated season with the finale trp reaching 6.2 and the average trp being 4.8.

During the launch on 3 October, fourteen hand-picked housemates entered the house located in Lonavla, a hill station, about 100 kilometres east of Mumbai in the Indian state of Maharashtra. Two additional wild card entries were made during the second and third weeks, taking the number of contestants to sixteen. The housemates, considered strangers to each other, spent 96 days (14 weeks) locked up together under the supervision of 32 cameras fitted around the house. Four of the housemates, Ashmit Patel, Dolly Bindra, The Great Khali and Shweta Tiwari, reached the final week, facing public vote. The show ended on 8 January 2011 with the grand finale. Shweta Tiwari emerged as the winner, going away with a prize money of  10 million, while The Great Khali was announced as the runner-up.

Housemates status

Housemates

Original entrants
 Abbas Kazmi – Ajmal Kasab ‘s renowned Lawyer.
 Ashmit Patel – Bollywood actor. He is known for his role in films like Murder and Silsilay. Actress Ameesha Patel is his sister.
 Ali Saleem – Pakistani TV anchor. He cross-dresses as a woman wearing a sari and asks influential guests provocative questions in his show Late Night with Begum Nawazish Ali.
 Inder Singh ICFAI WALA (Bunty Chor) – Criminal. He has been accused of robbery and was on the most wanted list of the Delhi police. Dibakar Banerjee has made a film on him, Oye Lucky! Lucky Oye!, where Abhay Deol played the protagonist.
 Hrishant Goswami – Model. He is the winner of the 2004 Gladrags Manhunt contest.
 Manoj Tiwari – Bhojpuri actor and politician. He has appeared in over 50 films in the industry. 
 Rahul Bhatt – Actor. He is the son of Mahesh Bhatt and brother of Alia Bhatt.
 Sakshi Pradhan – Reality TV Star. She is the winner of the second season of the reality show MTV Splitsvilla.
 Samir Soni – Bollywood actor. He is known for his roles in films like Kabhie Tum Kabhie Hum and Vivah. He also appeared in the popular drama series Jassi Jaissi Koi Nahin. He won the Most Stylish Housemate award in the finale, a Chevrolet car as the prize. 
 Sara Khan - TV Actress. Sara is the youngest of all the contestants from this season. She rose the fame of Sadhana from the Star Plus popular show Sapna Babul Ka...Bidaai.
 Seema Parihar – Indian politician. She has also acted in Wounded – a film based on her real-life story.
 Shweta Tiwari – Indian television star. Shweta is well known for playing the famous role of Prerna in the popular Ekta Kapoor longest running serial Kasautii Zindagii Kay which aired on Star Plus.
 Veena Malik – Pakistani actress and model. She has appeared in many films like Tere Pyar Mein, Pind Di Kudi and Kyun Tum Se Itna Pyar Hai in the Pakistani industry.

Wild card entries
 Dalip Singh Rana / Great Khali – Wrestler. 
 Dolly Bindra – Actress.

Guests entrants
Throughout the series various guests may appear from time to time for a visit.
 Ali Merchant stayed in the house as a guest from day 30 to day 41.
 Pamela Anderson entered the house on 16 November 2010 and stayed for 3 days.

Weekly Summary

Nomination table

Notes 
 
  indicates the House Captain.
  indicates that the Housemate was directly nominated for eviction prior to the regular nominations process.
  indicates that the Housemate was granted immunity from nominations.

Ratings, reception and viewership
 According to data available with aMap, a television viewership monitoring agency, the opening episode of Bigg Boss 4 on Colors got a rating of 3.6. Season 3 had average rating of 2.43 while Bigg Boss 1 and Bigg Boss 2 had average ratings of 1.96 and 2.03. While Bigg Boss 1 was anchored by Arshad Warsi, Shilpa Shetty hosted Bigg Boss 2 and Amitabh Bachchan for Bigg Boss 3.
 The Grand Finale episode on 8 January 2011, received a TRP of 6.7, which was the highest among the finale of other Indian reality shows such as Kaun Banega Crorepati, Rahul Dulhaniya Le Jayega, MasterChef and DID –Li'l Masters.

Controversies
During the first week of the show's airing, activists of Shiv Sena, a political party, started protesting against the inclusion of Pakistani housemates in the show. After being evicted from the house, Rahul Bhatt claimed that Bigg Boss is scripted. In November 2010, the Information and Broadcasting Ministry served a notice on Colors, due to complaints of indecent exposure aired on national television, asking the channel to change the timings of the show from 9:00 pm to 11:30 pm. The channel later got a stay order from Bombay High Court allowing them to continue the telecast of the show during prime time.

References

External links
 Bigg Boss Season 4 Official Website

2010 Indian television seasons
2011 Indian television seasons
04